Mikhail Yudin may refer to:
 Mikhail Yudin (footballer)
 Mikhail Yudin (serial killer)